The 2009 Primera División del Fútbol Profesional Chileno season was the 78th season of top-flight football in Chile. The season was composed of two championships: the Torneo Apertura & Torneo Clasura.

Format changes
The format for 2009 remains largely the same as 2008, except for the advancement to the Playoff Stages. Groups will no longer be used to determine who advance to the next stage. Instead, the top-eight teams in Classification Stage will advance.

International qualification changes
Qualification to the Copa Libertadores remains the same, as well as qualification to the Chile 1 spot in the Copa Sudamericana. The Chile 2 spot will be contested between the second-best team in the first stage and the 2008-09 Copa Chile winner. The winner of the single match will qualify to the 2009 Copa Sudamericana.

Team information
The number of teams were reduced starting with this season from 20 to 18. Antofagasta, Osorno, Melipilla, and Deportes Concepción were relegated last season to the Primera B. They were replaced by Municipal Iquique and Curicó Unido.

Torneo Apertura

The Torneo Apertura, officially the Campeonato Nacional de Apertura de Primera División de Fútbol Profesional, was the first tournament of the season. It began on January 31 and ended on June 28.

Classification stage

Standings

Results

Playoff stage

Top goalscorers

Copa Sudamericana playoff

Torneo Clausura

The Torneo Clasura, officially the Campeonato Nacional de Clausura de Primera División de Fútbol Profesional, was the second tournament of the season. It began on July 12 and was ended on December 16.

Classification Stage

Standings

Results

Playoff stage

Top goalscorers

Relegation

See also 
2009 in Chilean football
2009 Copa Chile
List of 2009 Primera División de Chile transfers

References

External links
ANFP 
Season regulations 
2009 season on RSSSF

  
Primera División de Chile seasons
Chile
1